Derrick Brown (born April 15, 1998) is an American football defensive end for the Carolina Panthers of the National Football League (NFL). He played college football at Auburn and was drafted by the Panthers in the first round of the 2020 NFL Draft.

High school career
Derrick Brown was born in Sugar Hill, Georgia on April 15, 1998. He later attended Lanier High School in Sugar Hill, Georgia, where he had 33.5 quarterback sacks, 270 tackles, 5 forced fumbles, and 3 interceptions as a defensive tackle. As a senior, Brown was seen as one of best high school defensive tackles in the nation, where he considered multiple schools during his recruitment, with Georgia and Alabama being seen as the favorites to land him, before he committed to Auburn University on February 3, 2016.

College career
As a freshman in 2016, Brown's recorded 11 tackles with a sack and fumble recovery. As a sophomore in 2017, Brown started in all 12 games, recorded 49 total tackles, 3.5 sacks, 8.5 tackles for a loss, and 2 forced fumbles. Brown earned second-team All-SEC honors as a junior, with 48 tackles including 10.5 for a loss and 4.5 sacks. As a senior, he had 55 tackles including 12.5 tackles for a loss, four sacks, two forced fumbles and four pass breakups, earning himself All-American honors and was named the SEC Defensive Player of the Year.

Statistics

Professional career

Brown was selected seventh overall by the Carolina Panthers in the 2020 NFL Draft. He signed his four-year rookie contract on May 13, 2020, worth a fully guaranteed $23.621 million. He was placed on the reserve/COVID-19 list by the Panthers on December 7, 2020, and activated on December 11. In Week 15 against the Green Bay Packers, Brown recorded his first two career sacks on Aaron Rodgers during the 24–16 loss.

Statistics

Personal life
Brown's wife is Tayla Main, and together they have two children, a son and a daughter.

References

External links
Auburn Tigers football bio
Carolina Panthers bio

1998 births
Living people
People from Gwinnett County, Georgia
Sportspeople from the Atlanta metropolitan area
Players of American football from Georgia (U.S. state)
American football defensive tackles
Auburn Tigers football players
All-American college football players
Carolina Panthers players